Indicum, Indian in Latin, may refer to:

Music
Indicum (album), album by Swedish band Bobo Stenson Trio

Companies
 Indicum (company), Swedish interior architects

See also
 Indicus (disambiguation)
 Indica (disambiguation)